Orthoceras strictum, commonly known as the bird's-mouth orchid or horned orchid, is a species of orchid native to eastern and southern Australia, New Zealand and New Caledonia. It has between two and five linear leaves and up to nine yellowish green, brownish or blackish flowers with two long, erect to spreading lateral sepals.

Description
Flower colour varies from blackish, brownish, maroon to yellowish green. There is a pyramid-shaped callus near the base of the labellum. Flowering occurs from November to February.

Taxonomy and naming
Orthoceras strictum was first formally described in 1810 by Robert Brown and the description was published in his book Prodromus Florae Novae Hollandiae et Insulae Van Diemen. The generic name (Orthoceras) is derived from the Ancient Greek words orthos meaning "straight" and keras, keratos meaning "horn, which alludes to the upright lateral sepals. The specific epithet (strictum) is a Latin word meaning "straight" or "tight".

Distribution and habitat
The bird's-mouth orchid is widespread but uncommon and occurs in New South Wales, Queensland, South Australia, Tasmania, Victoria and New Caledonia. It grows in a wide range of habitats from grassy forest to heath. The differences between this species and Orthoceras novae-zeelandiae from New Zealand are "very slight and dubious".

Conservation
Orthoceras strictum is listed in Tasmania as "rare" under the Tasmanian Government Threatened Species Protection Act 1995.

References

External links 
 
 

Diuridinae
Orchids of Oceania
Orchids of New South Wales
Orchids of Victoria (Australia)
Orchids of South Australia
Orchids of Tasmania
Orchids of Queensland
Orchids of New Zealand
Orchids of New Guinea
Orchids of New Caledonia
Plants described in 1810